"Woo Weekend" is the thirtieth single by BoA, released on July 21, 2010. It was released in a normal CD-only edition and a limited CD+DVD edition. The B-Side to the song is "No Dance, No Life". "Woo Weekend" was used as the theme song for Japan's Disney on Ice 25th anniversary, as well as was used in a commercial promoting it.

Track listing

Charts
Oricon Chart (Japan)

References

2010 singles
BoA songs
2010 songs
Avex Trax singles